The 2009 China League One is the sixth season since the establishment. League kicked off on 28 March 2009 and is scheduled to end on 25 October 2009.

Winners and runners-up promotes to Chinese Super League next season and the last placed team was relegated to League Two.  League One expands to 14 teams next season.

Zhu Zhengrong of Shanghai East Asia scored the first hat-trick of the season against Sichuan at Shanghai Stadium on 28 Aug 2009.

Leonardo of Shenyang Dongjin scored the second hat-trick of the season against Nanchang at Shenyang Olympic Stadium on 10 Oct 2009.

Martin of Nanchang Bayi Hengyuan scored the third hat-trick of the season against Nanjing at Bayi Stadium on 25 Oct 2009.

Promotion and Relegation
After 2008 season, Jiangsu Sainty and Chongqing Lifan were promoted to Chinese Super League 2009 and Yantai Yiteng were relegated to China League Two 2009. They were replaced by Guangdong Sunray Cave and Shenyang Dongjin which promoted from League Two 2008 and Liaoning Whowin who relegated from Super League 2008.

League table

Results

Top scorers
Updated to games played on 25 Oct 2009

References

China League One seasons
2
China
China